Holter Idrettsforening is a Norwegian sports club from Holter in Nannestad. It has sections for association football and team handball.

It was founded on 3 June 1918. In 1941 it incorporated the AIF club Holter AIL.

The men's football team last played in the Norwegian Second Division in 1997. Players from that time include Snorre Harstad, John Anders Skoglund and Terje Joelsen. The team currently plays in the Fourth Division.

References

 Official site 

Football clubs in Norway
Sport in Akershus
Association football clubs established in 1918
1918 establishments in Norway